is trans-Neptunian object and retrograde damocloid on a highly eccentric, cometary-like orbit. It was first observed on 1 November 2005, by astronomers with the Mount Lemmon Survey at the Mount Lemmon Observatory in Arizona, United States. It has the 3rd largest known heliocentric semi-major axis and aphelion. Additionally its perihelion lies within the orbit of Jupiter, which means it also has the largest orbital eccentricity of any known minor planet.

Description 

 orbits the Sun at a distance of 4.1–1,826 AU once every 27,672 years (semi-major axis of 915 AU). Its orbit has an eccentricity of 0.9955 and an inclination of 112° with respect to the ecliptic. It belongs to the dynamical group of damocloids due to its retrograde orbit and its low Tisserand parameter (TJupiter of −0.9430). It is a Jupiter-, Saturn-, Uranus-, and Neptune-crosser. The body's observation arc begins with its first observation by the Mount Lemmon Survey on 1 November 2005.

 has a barycentric semi-major axis of ~1026 AU.  and  have a larger barycentric semi-major axis. The epoch of January 2016 was when  had its largest heliocentric semi-major axis.

The object has a short observation arc of 81 days and does not have a well constrained orbit. It has not been observed since January 2006, when it came to perihelion, 4.1 AU from the Sun. It may be a dormant comet that has not been seen outgassing. In the past it may have made closer approaches to the Sun that could have removed most near-surface volatiles. The current orbit crosses the ecliptic just inside Jupiter's orbit and has a Jupiter-MOID of 0.8 AU.

In 2017, it had an apparent magnitude of ~28 and was 24 AU from the Sun. It comes to opposition in mid-June. It would require one of the largest telescopes in the world for any more follow-up observations.

Comparison

See also 
 
 
 
 List of Solar System objects by greatest aphelion

Notes

References

External links 
 Shefford Observatory - 2005 November notes: 2005 WC, 2005 VX3, 2005 WY3, 2005 WN3, 2005 WY, GS5BRH
 

Trans-Neptunian objects
Damocloids

Minor planet object articles (unnumbered)
20051101
Minor planets with a retrograde orbit